Packera cardamine is a species of flowering plant in the aster family known by the common name bittercress ragwort.

It is endemic to Arizona and New Mexico in the Southwestern United States.

References

cana
Flora of Arizona
Flora of New Mexico
Endemic flora of the United States
Taxa named by Edward Lee Greene
Flora without expected TNC conservation status